Events in 1946 in animation.

Events

January 
 January 4: Terrytoons produces The Thieving Magpies, in which Heckle and Jeckle make their debut.
 January 5: Bob Clampett's Book Revue premieres, produced by Warner Bros. Cartoons.

February 
 February 2: Friz Freleng's Baseball Bugs is first released, produced by Warner Bros. Cartoons and starring Bugs Bunny.

March 
 March 7: 18th Academy Awards: Hanna-Barbera's Tom & Jerry cartoon Quiet Please!, produced by MGM, wins the Academy Award for Best Animated Short.
 March 8: Jack Hannah's Goofy cartoon A Knight for a Day, produced by The Walt Disney Company, premieres.
 March 9: Tex Avery's Lonesome Lenny premieres, produced by MGM. It is the final Screwy Squirrel cartoon.
 March 16: Bob Clampett's Porky Pig and Daffy Duck cartoon Baby Bottleneck premieres, produced by Warner Bros. Cartoons.
 March 20: Bob McKimson's Hollywood Canine Canteen premieres, produced by Warner Bros. Cartoons, featuring caricatures of Hollywood actors as anthropomorphic dogs.

April 
 April 20: Jack Kinney, Clyde Geronimi, Hamilton Luske and Joshua Meador's Make Mine Music, produced by The Walt Disney Company, is first released. It is an anthology film and consists of ten animated segments accompanied by music.

May 
 May 16: The first Danish animated feature film, The Tinderbox, based on the fairy tale by Hans Christian Andersen and directed by Svend Methling, is first released.
 May 18: Hanna-Barbera's Tom & Jerry cartoon The Milky Waif is first released, produced by MGM, which marks the debut of Nibbles.
 May 25: Chuck Jones' Bugs Bunny cartoon  Hair-Raising Hare is first released, produced by Warner Bros. Cartoons. It marks the debut of Gossamer.

June 
 June 8: Bob Clampett's Porky Pig and Sylvester the Cat cartoon Kitty Kornered is first released, produced by Warner Bros. Cartoons.
 June 22: Friz Freleng's Hollywood Daffy premieres, produced by Warner Bros. Cartoons, in which Daffy Duck visits Hollywood and meets and impersonates celebrity actors.
 June 28: Jack King's Donald Duck cartoon Donald's Double Trouble premieres, produced by Walt Disney Animation Studios. In it, Donald uses a well-mannered lookalike to make a good impression on Daisy Duck.
 June 29: William Hanna and Joseph Barbera's Tom & Jerry cartoon Trap Happy, produced by MGM, is first released.

July 
 July 20: Bob Clampett's Daffy Duck cartoon  The Great Piggy Bank Robbery, produced by Warner Bros. Cartoons, is first released.

August 
 August 3: Tex Avery's Droopy cartoon Northwest Hounded Police, produced by MGM, premieres.
 August 31: Bob McKimson's Walky Talky Hawky premieres, produced by Warner Bros. Cartoons; it marks the debuts of Foghorn Leghorn and Barnyard Dawg.

September 
 September 6: George Pal's John Henry and the Inky-Poo premieres.
 September 14: Friz Freleng's Bugs Bunny cartoon Racketeer Rabbit is first released, produced by Warner Bros. Cartoons.
 September 28: Chuck Jones' Fair and Worm-er premieres, produced by Warner Bros. Cartoons.

October 
 October 5: Bob Clampett's Bugs Bunny short The Big Snooze is first released. It is the final Warner Bros. Cartoons cartoon directed by him before his retirement.
 October 26: Tex Avery's Henpecked Hoboes premieres, produced by MGM which marks the debut of George and Junior.

November 
 November 1: The Story of Menstruation, an educational film for young teenagers about menstruation produced by The Walt Disney Company, is first released.
 November 1: The Donald Duck and Goofy short Frank Duck Brings 'Em Back Alive is released by RKO Radio Pictures.
 November 9: Friz Freleng's Bugs Bunny cartoon Rhapsody Rabbit premieres, produced by Warner Bros. Cartoons.
 November 12: Song of the South, a film combining live-action and animation, is first released. The live-action scenes are directed by Harve Foster, while the animated scenes are directed by Wilfred Jackson and produced by Walt Disney Animation Studios. It marks the debut of the characters Br'er Rabbit, Br'er Fox and Br'er Bear who will become popular comic characters. However, decades later, it became controversial due to being accused of promoting racial stereotypes and romanticizing slavery.

December 
 December 20: Jack Hannah's Goofy cartoon Double Dribble, produced by The Walt Disney Company, premieres.

Specific date unknown
 Karel Zeman's Podkova pro štěstí ("Horseshoe for Luck") premieres which marks the debut of Mr. Prokouk.

Films released

 April 20 - Make Mine Music (United States)
 May 16 - The Tinderbox (Denmark)
 November 12 - Song of the South (United States)

Births

January
 January 5: Diane Keaton, American actress (voice of Jenny in Finding Dory, Michellee Weebie-Am-I in Green Eggs and Ham).
 January 19: Dolly Parton, American singer-songwriter, actress, philanthropist, and businesswoman (voice of Dolly Gnome in Gnomeo and Juliet, Katrina Murphy in The Magic School Bus episode "The Family Holiday Special", Noleen Hen in the Lily's Driftwood Bay episode "The Salty Chicken", herself in the Alvin and the Chipmunks episode "Urban Chipmunk" and The Simpsons episode "Sunday, Cruddy Sunday").

February
 February 2: Blake Clark, American actor and comedian (voice of Hogwash in The New Woody Woodpecker Show, RadioShack Walkie-Talkie in Eight Crazy Nights, Buford in Rango, Chief in Fish Hooks, Sheriff Cantaloupe and Asparagus in The High Fructose Adventures of Annoying Orange, Roland in Harvey Beaks, continued voice of Slinky Dog in the Toy Story franchise).
 February 14: Gregory Hines, American dancer, actor, choreographer and singer (voice of Big Bill in Little Bill), (d. 2003).
 February 20: Sandy Duncan, American actress, comedian, dancer and singer (voice of Vixey in The Fox and the Hound, Firefly, Applejack and Medley in My Little Pony: Rescue at Midnight Castle, Peepers in Rock-a-Doodle, Queen Uberta in The Swan Princess, herself in The New Scooby-Doo Movies episode "Sandy Duncan's Jekyll and Hyde" and the Scooby-Doo and Guess Who? episode "The Dreaded Remake of Jekyll & Hyde!").
 February 21: Anthony Daniels, English actor (voice of C-3PO in the Star Wars franchise, Robot Chicken, The Lego Movie, and Ralph Breaks the Internet, Legolas in The Lord of the Rings).

March
 March 6: Jacques Verbeek, Dutch animator and comics artist (made animated films with Karin Wiertz), (d. 1993).
 March 12: Frank Welker, American voice actor (voice of Fred Jones in the Scooby-Doo franchise, Megatron and Soundwave in The Transformers and Transformers: Prime, Iceman in Spider-Man and His Amazing Friends, the title characters in Dynomutt, Dog Wonder and Jabberjaw, Hefty Smurf in The Smurfs, Brain, Dr. Claw, and Mad Cat in Inspector Gadget, Ray Stantz and Slimer in The Real Ghostbusters, Kermit in Muppet Babies, Bigtime and Baggy Beagle in DuckTales, Abu in Aladdin, Thaddeus Plotz, Ralph the Guard, Runt, Buttons, and Chicken Boo in Animaniacs, Nibbler in Futurama, Garfield in The Garfield Show, continued voice of Barney Rubble, Dino, and Scooby-Doo).
 March 21: Timothy Dalton, English actor (voice of Mr. Pricklepants in the Toy Story franchise, Ged/Sparrowhawk in Tales from Earthsea, Lord Milori in Secret of the Wings, Demanitus in Rapunzel's Tangled Adventure).
 March 29: Bob Richardson, American animator and producer (Popeye the Sailor, A Pup Named Scooby-Doo, Bobby's World).
 March 27: Carl Weintraub, American actor (voice of DeSoto in Oliver & Company).
 March 31: Dave Thomson, American animator and scene-planner (Walt Disney Animation Studios, Bebe's Kids, The Pagemaster, Cats Don't Dance), (d. 2021).

April
 April 8: Stuart Pankin, American actor (voice of Sultan Pasta Al-Dente in Aladdin, Donald Tannor in The Zeta Project, Condiment King in the Batman: The Animated Series episode "Make 'Em Laugh", additional voices in Hercules and The Brothers Flub).
 April 12: Ed O'Neill, American actor (voice of Mr. Litwak in Wreck-It Ralph and Ralph Breaks the Internet, Hank in Finding Dory, Grandpa in the Kick Buttowski: Suburban Daredevil episode "Truth or Daredevil", Mayor Thompson in the Handy Manny episode "Great Garage Rescue", Orson in The Penguins of Madagascar episode "Operation: Antarctica", Bud Swanson in the Family Guy episode "Papa Has a Rollin' Son").
 April 19: Tim Curry, English actor (voice of Taurus Bulba in Darkwing Duck, Captain Hook in Peter Pan and the Pirates, Hexxus in FernGully: The Last Rainforest, Nigel Thornberry in The Wild Thornberrys, Forte in Beauty and the Beast: The Enchanted Christmas, Ben Ravencroft in Scooby-Doo and the Witch's Ghost, Joseph Chadwick in the Ben 10 franchise, Drake in The Pebble and the Penguin, Lord Dragonus in Mighty Ducks, Palpatine in season 5 and 6 of Star Wars: The Clone Wars, Professor Finbarr Calamitous in The Adventures of Jimmy Neutron, Boy Genius, Pretorius in The Mask: Animated Series, King Acorn in Sonic the Hedgehog, Auntie Whispers in the Over the Garden Wall episode "The Ringing of the Bell", Dr. Mystico in the Freakazoid! episode "Island of Dr. Mystico").
 April 22: John Waters, American filmmaker, writer, actor and artist (voice of John in The Simpsons episode "Homer's Phobia", Quetzalpacatlan in the Superjail! episode "Ghosts", Yeti Lobster in the Fish Hooks episode "Rock Yeti Lobster", Dr. Kelton in the Mr. Pickles episode "Coma", Captain Tom in the Clarence episode "Plane Excited", Wadworth Thorndyke the Third in the Mickey Mouse episode "The Fancy Gentleman").
 April 23: Michael Sporn, American animator and film director (Doctor DeSoto, The Man Who Walked Between the Towers) and producer (Michael Sporn Animation), (d. 2014).
 April 26: Claude Viseur, aka Clovis, Belgian comic artist and animator (Belvision), (d. 2018).
 April 29: Wayne Robson, Canadian actor (voice of Frank in The Rescuers Down Under), (d. 2011).
 April 30: Bill Plympton, American animator, graphic designer, cartoonist and filmmaker (Your Face, The Tune, I Married a Strange Person!, Mutant Aliens, Guard Dog, Hair High, Idiots and Angels, The Cow Who Wanted to Be a Hamburger, Cheatin', animated the couch gags for The Simpsons episodes "Beware My Cheating Bart", "Black Eyed, Please", "Married to the Blob", "Lisa the Veterinarian", "22 for 30", "3 Scenes Plus a Tag from a Marriage", "Manger Things" and "One Angry Lisa").

May
 May 1: Nellie Bellflower, American actress (voice of Princess Ariel in Thundarr the Barbarian, Danielle in The Flight of Dragons, Lady Boreal in Rudolph and Frosty's Christmas in July).
 May 6: Larry Huber, American animator, television writer and producer (Hanna-Barbera, Ruby-Spears Enterprises, Nickelodeon Animation Studio, Danger Rangers, co-creator of ChalkZone).
 May 10: Donovan, Scottish musician (voiced himself in the Futurama episode "The Deep South").
 May 13: Marv Wolfman, American comic book and television writer (Jem, The Transformers, Monster Force, ReBoot, Pocket Dragon Adventures, voiced himself in the Teen Titans Go! episodes "Marv Wolfman & George Perez" and "Creative Geniuses").

June
 June 19: Jennifer Darling, American actress (voice of Ayeka Masaki Jurai in Tenchi Muyo!, Pythona in G.I. Joe: The Movie, Irma in Teenage Mutant Ninja Turtles, Pixlee Trollsom and Deputroll Dolly in Trollkins, Angelica in The Gary Coleman Show, Amber in The Centurions, Muffet in Christmas in Tattertown, Wiggle in The Biskitts, Berkeley in Capitol Critters, Princess Sabina in The Smurfs).
 June 24: Robert Reich, American professor, author, lawyer and political commentator (voiced himself in The Simpsons episode "Poorhouse Rock").
 June 26: Ricky Jay, American stage magician, actor and writer (narrator in the Teen Titans Go! episode "Double Trouble", voiced himself in The Simpsons episode "The Great Simpsina"), (d. 2018).
 June 28:
 Gilda Radner, American comedian and actress (various voices in Animalympics), (d. 1989).
 Bruce Davison, American actor (voice of Slade Wilson in Justice League: Crisis on Two Earths, Zuko in The Legend of Korra).

July
 July 6:
 Sylvester Stallone, American actor and film director (voice of Corporal Weaver in Antz, Lieutenant Victor von Ion in Ratchet & Clank, Bulletman in Animal Crackers, Paul Revere in the Liberty's Kids episode "Midnight Ride").
 Fred Dryer, American actor and former football player (voice of Sergeant Rock in the Justice League episode "The Savage Time").
 July 7: Joe Spano, American actor (voice of Agent Bennet in Batman Beyond, Mr. Osgood in the Static Shock episode "Jimmy").
 July 13: Cheech Marin, American actor (voice of Tito in Oliver & Company, Stump in FernGully: The Last Rainforest, Banzai in The Lion King franchise, Ramone in the Cars franchise, Mad Hog in Hoodwinked Too! Hood vs. Evil, Pancho Rodriguez in The Book of Life, Quita Moz in Elena of Avalor, Carlos Ramirez in the South Park episode "Cherokee Hair Tampons", himself in The Simpsons episode "A Midsummer's Nice Dream").
 July 15: Linda Ronstadt, American retired singer (voiced herself in The Simpsons episode "Mr. Plow", performed the song "Somewhere Out There" in An American Tail).
 July 16: Dave Goelz, American puppeteer (voice of Subconscious Guard Frank in Inside Out).
 July 17: Giannalberto Bendazzi, Italian animation historian (Cartoons - 100 Years of Cinema Animation), (d. 2021).
 July 20: Bob Heatlie, Scottish songwriter, record producer and composer (The Trap Door, HIT Entertainment, Little Robots).
 July 22: Danny Glover, American actor, director and activist (voice of Barbatus in Antz, Jethro in The Prince of Egypt, President Chen in Battle for Terra, Professor Apollo in the Captain Planet and the Planeteers episode "Isle of Solar Energy", Krampus in the American Dad! episode "Minstrel Krampus").

August
 August 12: Caroline Leaf, Canadian-American filmmaker, animator, director, producer, and tutor (Sand Animation).
 August 19: Ferenc Rofusz, Hungarian animator (The Fly).
 August 26: Rickie Sorensen, American actor (voice of Spotty in 101 Dalmatians, Arthur in The Sword in the Stone), (d. 1994).
 August 27: Yuriy Meshcheryakov, Russian-Ukrainian animator (The Tale of Tsar Saltan), (d. 2001).

September
 September 11: Julie Payne, American actress (voice of Liz Wilson in the Garfield franchise).
 September 18: Gailard Sartain, American actor (voice of Case Manager in the King of the Hill episode "Pilot", Big Daddy in The Simpsons episode "The Simpsons Spin-Off Showcase", Big O in The Angry Beavers episode "Sqotters") and television writer (The Angry Beavers).
 September 28: Jeffrey Jones, American actor (voice of Presidentman, Shadow Hog and other various characters in Invader Zim, Uncle Crenshaw in Stuart Little, Warden in the Duckman episode "I, Duckman", Nivens and Vinnie in the Batman: The Animated Series episode "A Bullet for Bullock", Nurse and Man in White in the Aaahh!!! Real Monsters episode "This is Your Brain on Ickis", Detective Marcus in The Zeta Project episode "The Wrong Morph", Sir Swami in the Justice League episode "Legends").
 September 30: Fran Brill, American retired puppeteer (Sesame Street, The Muppet Show, Dog City, Big Bag) and actress (voice of Loretta LaQuigley and Mrs. Perigrew in Doug, Little Girl in the Sheep in the Big City episode "Baah-Dern Times", Eliza and Elisa Stitch in the Courage the Cowardly Dog episode "The Quilt Club", Lightening Snail and List Text in the Wallykazam! episode "Dragon Hiccups", Bluejay and Sparrow in the HBO Storybook Musicals episode "The Tale of Peter Rabbit").

October
 October 4: Susan Sarandon, American actress and activist (portrayed and voiced Queen Narissa in Enchanted, voice of Miss Spider in James and the Giant Peach, Mrs. Clark in Our Friend, Martin, Golden Queen in Skylanders Academy, the Narrator in Goodnight Moon and Other Sleepy Time Tales, Coco LaBouche in Rugrats in Paris: The Movie, Chimène in April and the Extraordinary World, Barb the Angel in Hell and Back, Bananny in Spark: A Space Tail, Lorraine in My Entire High School Sinking Into the Sea, Aunt Agatha and Mom Shopper in Neo Yokio, Dr. Wong in Rick and Morty, Mom in Fearless, Ballet Teacher in The Simpsons episode "Homer vs. Patty and Selma", Mrs. Jasperterian in the American Dad! episode "Portrait of Francine's Genitals", Louise, Chloe, Gen Z Advertising Executive and Handmaid in the Robot Chicken episode "Ginger Hill in: Bursting Pipes", herself in The Simpsons episode "Bart Has Two Mommies").
 October 16: Suzanne Somers, American actress, author, singer, businesswoman and health spokesperson (voiced herself in The Simpsons episode "The Day the Violence Died").
 October 21: Lux Interior, American singer (voice of Bird Brains Lead Singer in SpongeBob SquarePants, Rayo X, Tarzan Eightball and Goth Boy in Los Campeones de la Lucha Libre), (d. 2009).
 October 22: Richard McGonagle, American actor (voice of Four Arms and Exo-Skull in Ben 10, General Grievous in Star Wars: Clone Wars, Dr. I.Q. Hi in Duck Dodgers, Brainiac in Batman: The Brave and the Bold, Chameleon Sr. in OK K.O.! Let's Be Heroes, Abin Sur in Green Lantern: First Flight, Eight-Armed Willy in The Marvelous Misadventures of Flapjack).
 October 27: Ivan Reitman, Slovak-born Canadian film and television director, screenwriter and producer (Heavy Metal, Beethoven, Space Jam, Mummies Alive!, Alienators: Evolution Continues), (d. 2022).

November
 November 1: Yuko Shimizu, Japanese designer (creator of Hello Kitty).
 November 3: Tom Savini, American prosthetic makeup artist, actor, stunt performer and film director (voiced himself in The Simpsons episode "Worst Episode Ever").
 November 20: Samuel E. Wright, American actor and singer (voice of Sebastian in The Little Mermaid franchise, Kron in Dinosaur), (d. 2021).
 November 25: Marc Brown, American author and illustrator (creator of Arthur).
 November 26: Lina Gagnon, Canadian animator (National Film Board of Canada), (d. 2022).
 November 28: Joe Dante, American actor, film editor, producer and director (Small Soldiers, Looney Tunes: Back in Action).

December
 December 1: Jonathan Katz, American comedian and actor (voice of Dr. Katz in Dr. Katz, Professional Therapist, Erik Robbins in Home Movies).
 December 4: Sherry Alberoni, American actress (voice of Alexandra Cabot in Josie and the Pussycats, Wendy Harris in Super Friends, Laurie Partridge in Partridge Family 2200 A.D., Bo in Mighty Orbots).
 December 15: Stefanianna Christopherson, American actress and singer (voice of Princess Dawn in Here Comes the Grump, Daphne Blake in season 1 of Scooby-Doo, Where Are You!).
 December 16: Charles Dennis, Canadian actor (voice of Rico in Home on the Range).
 December 17: Eugene Levy, Canadian actor and comedian (voice of Captain Sternn and Edsel in Heavy Metal, Craig Ehrlich in Duckman, Joe Larsen in Committed, Clovis in Curious George, Lou in Over the Hedge, Orrin in Astro Boy, Charlie in Finding Dory, Midas in the Hercules episode "Hercules and the Golden Touch", Plug Guard in the Dilbert episode "The Return", additional voices in the Camp Candy episode "When It Rains... It Snows").
 December 18: Steven Spielberg, American film director (The Adventures of Tintin), screenwriter and producer (Warner Bros. Animation, An American Tail, Who Framed Roger Rabbit, The Land Before Time, A Wish for Wings That Work, Fievel's American Tails, Casper, Monster House, The Adventures of Tintin, Jurassic World Camp Cretaceous, founder of Amblimation, co-founder of Amblin Entertainment and DreamWorks Animation, voice of White Rabbit and himself in the Tiny Toon Adventures episodes "New Character Day" and "Buster and Babs Go Hawaiian").

Specific date unknown
 Bob Dermer, Canadian actor (voice of Grumpy Bear in Care Bears, Ralph Raccoon in The Raccoons).

Deaths

January
 January 2: O'Galop, French painter, illustrator, graphic designer, animator and comics artist, dies at age 78.

November
 November 9: Scotty Mattraw, American actor (voice of Bashful in Snow White and the Seven Dwarfs), dies at age 66.
 November 26: Charles Bowers, American comedian, animator and cartoonist (Raoul Barré, Walter Lantz), dies at age 59.

See also
List of anime by release date (1946–1959)

References

External links 
Animated works of the year, listed in the IMDb